Grammosolen is a genus of flowering plants belonging to the family Solanaceae.

Its native range is South Australia.

Species:

Grammosolen dixonii 
Grammosolen truncatus

References

Solanaceae
Solanaceae genera